DCMU (3-(3,4-dichlorophenyl)-1,1-dimethylurea) is an algicide and herbicide of the arylurea class that inhibits photosynthesis. It was introduced by Bayer in 1954 under the trade name of Diuron.

History
In 1952, chemists at E. I. du Pont de Nemours and Company patented a series of aryl urea derivatives as herbicides. Several compounds covered by this patent were commercialized as herbicides: monuron (4-chlorophenyl), chlortoluron (3-chloro-4-methylphenyl) and DCMU, the (3,4-dichlorophenyl) example. Subsequently, over thirty related urea analogs with the same mechanism of action reached the market worldwide.

Synthesis
As described in the du Pont patent, the starting material is a substituted aryl amine, an aniline, which is treated with phosgene to form its isocyanate derivative. This is subsequently reacted with dimethylamine to give the final product.
Aryl-NH2 + COCl2 → Aryl-NCO
Aryl-NCO + NH(CH3)2 → Aryl-NHCON(CH3)2

Mechanism of action
DCMU is a very specific and sensitive inhibitor of photosynthesis. It blocks the QB plastoquinone binding site of photosystem II, disallowing the electron flow from photosystem II to plastoquinone. This interrupts the photosynthetic electron transport chain in photosynthesis and thus reduces the ability of the plant to turn light energy into chemical energy (ATP and reductant potential).

DCMU only blocks electron flow from photosystem II, it has no effect on photosystem I or other reactions in photosynthesis, such as light absorption or carbon fixation in the Calvin cycle.

However, because it blocks electrons produced from water oxidation in PS II from entering the plastoquinone pool, "linear" photosynthesis is effectively shut down, as there are no available electrons to exit the photosynthetic electron flow cycle for reduction of NADP+ to NADPH.
In fact, it was found that DCMU not only does not inhibit the cyclic photosynthetic pathway, but, under certain circumstances, actually stimulates it.

Because of these effects, DCMU is often used to study energy flow in photosynthesis.

Toxicity
DCMU (Diuron) has been characterized as a known/likely human carcinogen based on animal testing.

References

Herbicides
Ureas
Toxicology
Anilines
Chlorobenzenes
Carcinogens